The West Indies cricket team toured Zimbabwe in June and July 2001 to play 2 Test matches against Zimbabwe. The series was named Clive Lloyd Trophy, in honor of former West Indian great Clive Lloyd. West Indies won the first title of the trophy by 1-0.

Before the Test series, West Indies participated to a triangular One Day International competition with Zimbabwe and India. The West Indies tour consisted 3 List A matches and 2 First-class matches as well.

Squads

Tour matches

List A: CFX Academy vs West Indians

List A: Zimbabwe Country vs West Indians

List A: Zimbabwe A vs West Indians

First-class: Zimbabwe President's XI vs West Indians

First-class: Zimbabwe A vs West Indians

Test series

1st Test

2nd Test

Coca-Cola Cup

The Coca-Cola Cup was a One Day International (ODI) tournament that was held between 23 June and 8 July 2001 in Zimbabwe. It was held after the Test series between Zimbabwe and India. India were the third team that competed in addition to Zimbabwe and West Indies for the Coca-Cola Cup. After six games between the three sides in the round-robin group stage, West Indies and India qualified for the final. India entered as favorites into the final having defeated West Indies in each of the two group-stage games. 

However, in the final played on 7 July at the Harare Sports Club, West Indies defeated India by 16 runs. After having been put in to bat upon losing the toss, openers Chris Gayle and Daren Ganga started off strongly for West Indies scoring 96 runs in the first 15 overs. Setting India a target of 291, Corey Collymore, picking the crucial wickets of Sachin Tendulkar, Sourav Ganguly and VVS Laxman, returned figures of 4/49, and was named the player of the match.

References

External links
 Tour home at ESPN Cricinfo

2001 in West Indian cricket
2001 in Zimbabwean cricket
International cricket competitions in 2001
2001
Zimbabwean cricket seasons from 2000–01